Phytomyptera is a genus of bristle flies in the family Tachinidae. There are at least 60 described species in Phytomyptera.

Species

References

Tachininae
Tachinidae genera
Taxa named by Camillo Rondani